The Family Secret is a 1924 American silent drama film directed by William A. Seiter and featuring child star Baby Peggy. It is based on Editha's Burglar, a story by Frances Hodgson Burnett first published in 1881 by St. Nicholas Magazine and adapted for the stage by Augustus E. Thomas.

Plot
Margaret Selfridge (Hulette) lives with her affluent father, Simon (Currier) and her Aunt Abigail (Lucy Beamont) in a mansion in New York City. She is involved in a romantic relationship with Garry Homes (Earle), an honest man from a modest background.

While walking through the city one day, Garry discovers Peggy crying outside a fruit stand, lost and alone. He quickly becomes fond of her, but he does not recognize her as his daughter, and takes her to the police station. The police call the Selfridges, but Garry leaves before they arrive to claim Peggy. He does however leave his dog behind to watch over Peggy; she becomes immediately attached to him and insists on adopting him.

Another ex-convict engages Garry to help him commit a burglary. He is reluctant to participate, but finally decides that the money will help him get back on his feet.

The Selfridge family decamps to their mansion in Westchester County, New York for the summer. One evening, Peggy asks if she can borrow her mother's most cherished possession: her wedding ring, which she wears on a chain around her neck. Margaret agrees, and Peggy happily wears the necklace to bed.

That night, Peggy is woken by noise in the house. She investigates and discovers Garry in the study as he is in the process of robbing the safe. She tells him he cannot steal her grandfather's jewels, and offers him Margaret's necklace in exchange. Garry immediately recognizes the ring on the necklace, and realizes that Peggy must be his daughter. Before he has a chance to explain the situation, Simon Selfridge returns home. He does not recognize Garry and shoots him, believing him to be an intruder.

Simon calls a doctor, and Garry eventually recovers from his injury. Simon finally reconciles with his daughter and welcomes Garry to their home. The film concludes with the entire Selfridge clan, Garry included, living as a happy family.

Cast

Preservation
The Family Secret is one of only five of Baby Peggy's full-length feature films to have survived to the present day with copies at the Library of Congress and in private film collections. Several versions of the film have been released on DVD.

References

External links

 
 
 
 
 

1924 films
American silent feature films
Films based on children's books
Films based on works by Frances Hodgson Burnett
American black-and-white films
1924 drama films
Films directed by William A. Seiter
Films set in Westchester County, New York
Universal Pictures films
Silent American drama films
1920s American films